Oreta hoenei is a moth in the family Drepanidae. It was described by Watson in 1967. It is found in China (Heilongjiang, Shanxi, Henan, Shaanxi, Ningxia, Gansu, Zhejiang, Hubei, Jiangxi, Hunan, Fujian, Sichuan, Chongqing, Yunnan).

Subspecies
Oreta hoenei hoenei (China: Heilongjiang, Shanxi, Henan, Shaanxi, Ningxia, Gansu)
Oreta hoenei inangulata Watson, 1967 (China: Sichuan, Chongqing, Yunnan)
Oreta hoenei tienia Watson, 1967 (China: Zhejiang, Hubei, Jiangxi, Hunan, Fujian)

References

Moths described in 1967
Drepaninae